Hamstreet is a village in Kent, in South East England.

The village is located 6 miles (10 km) south of Ashford on the A2070, the main road between Ashford and Hastings. The majority of the village is in the parish of Orlestone, named after a much older hamlet located 1 mile north of Hamstreet on the ridge of hills; however, part of the village falls within the parish of Warehorne, giving a total population of 1,988 and a former claim to having three pubs (the Duke's Head is located at the village centre and there were two rural pubs within Warehorne parish). One of the pubs in Warehorne parish (the Woolpack Inn) has been renovated by the owners of the Globe Inn in Rye..

The parish church, dedicated to the Good Shepherd , is now a shared Anglican/Methodist building, and the parish churches of Orlestone, Snave (now a redundant church), Ruckinge, Warehorne and Kenardington are all within the traditional benefice which was expanded to form the new Saxon Shore benefice along with Bilsington, Bonnington and Aldington.

History
Parts of the parish church of St Mary the Virgin, Orlestone date back to the 11th century.
Until the coming of the railway in 1851, Hamstreet was just a hamlet known as 'Ham' based around the village centre which contains many buildings in the traditional Kentish weatherboard style. The village expanded rapidly during the 20th century and had its moment of fame in 1991, when maps of Hamstreet at various stages in history were used on a series of postage stamps to mark 200 years of the Ordnance Survey – this chance arose because the Hamstreet area was the first to be mapped in this way. An episode of BBC TV's Countryfile was also devoted to the occasion. The village also featured in a mountaineering spoof in Blue Peter to raise money for charity.

Although from the 1970s onwards there has been a loss of some traditional village outlets, there are still a number of shops and places to eat and drink in the village, as well as a school, doctor's surgery, dental clinic and sports facilities.
The village is twinned with the village of Thérouanne in northern France.

Countryside
Two large areas of public woodland surround the village, namely Ham Street Woods and Orlestone Forest, Sites of Special Scientific Interest (SSSIs). Both are remnants of the ancient forest that once covered the whole of the Weald of Kent.
The Royal Military Canal, the UK's third longest defensive structure, passes by ½ mile to the south. Three long distance footpaths also run through the parish:
The Saxon Shore Way
The Royal Military Canal Path

The area is also popular with cyclists, as Romney Marsh to the south is completely flat.

Transport
Ham Street railway station opened in 1851. It was designed by William Trees and is in an Italianate style built in red brick.

References

External links
 Orlestone Parish Website, which covers Hamstreet.
 Warehorne Parish Website, which covers Warehorne.
 Hamstreet, Kent - Smugglers, stamps and the Saxon Shore is a private site which provides further historical info and related links

Villages in Kent
Villages in the Borough of Ashford